The 1876 Prince Edward Island election was held on 10 October 1876 to elect members of the House of Assembly of the province of Prince Edward Island, Canada. It was won by the Conservative party. It was Prince Edward Island's first general election as a Canadian province.

References
 

Elections in Prince Edward Island
1876 elections in Canada
1876 in Prince Edward Island
October 1876 events